Francisco Mira Dam is a reservoir in the Valencian Community, Spain.

Reservoirs in the Valencian Community
Dams in Spain